The Joint Aviation Authorities (JAA) was an associated body of the European Civil Aviation Conference representing the civil aviation regulatory authorities of a number of European States who had agreed to co-operate in developing and implementing common safety regulatory standards and procedures.  It was not a regulatory body, regulation being achieved through the member authorities.  It was in existence from 1970 until disbanded in 2009. Its headquarters were located in Hoofddorp near Schiphol airport in Netherlands.

JAA issued the Joint Aviation Requirements (JAR), intended to establish minimum requirements for air safety.

In implementing the so-called FUJA Report, the JAA had entered into a new phase as of 1 January 2007. In this new phase the former "JAA" had become "JAA T" (Transition). JAA T consisted of a Liaison Office (JAA LO) and a Training Office (JAA TO). The offices of JAA LO were located in the premises of European Aviation Safety Agency (EASA) in Cologne, Germany.

History
The JAA started as Joint Airworthiness Authorities in 1970.  Original objectives were only to produce common certification codes for large aeroplanes and for engines in order to meet the needs of European industry and international consortia (e.g., Airbus).  After 1987, its work was extended to operations, maintenance, licensing and certification/design standards for all classes of aircraft.

The adoption of the Regulation (EC) No 1592/2002 by the European Parliament and the Council of the European Union (EU) and the subsequent establishment of the EASA created a Europe-wide regulatory authority which has absorbed most functions of the JAA (in the EASA Members states). With the introduction of the EASA some non-EU members of the JAA became non-voting members of the EASA, while others were completely excluded from the legislative and executive process. Among the functions transferred is safety and environmental type-certification of aircraft, engines and parts and approval. Additional responsibilities have been subsequently added over time.

In 2009, JAA was disbanded. Only the training organisation, JAA-TO, remains.

JAA member states

Non-EU members 
Candidate members marked with * (as of January 2008)
EFTA countries are members of EASA.
*
*

 (EFTA member)
 (EFTA member)

*

 (EFTA member)
*
 (EFTA member)

*

EU members

See also 
Eurocontrol
European Aviation Safety Agency
European Civil Aviation Conference
Federal Aviation Administration

References

External links 
 JAA historical reference
 JAA Training Organisation Web site
 SKYbrary: The single point of reference in the network of aviation safety knowledge

Aviation authorities
Aviation in Europe
1970 establishments in Germany
2009 disestablishments in Germany
Organisations based in Cologne